Slah Karoui (born 11 September 1951) is a Tunisian football forward who played for Tunisia in the 1978 FIFA World Cup. He also played for Étoile Sportive du Sahel.

References

External links
FIFA profile

1951 births
Tunisian footballers
Tunisia international footballers
Association football forwards
Étoile Sportive du Sahel players
1978 FIFA World Cup players
Living people